These species belong to Miscophus, a genus of square-headed wasps in the family Crabronidae.

Miscophus species

 Miscophus absconditus de Andrade, 1960 i c g
 Miscophus aegyptius Morice, 1897 i c g
 Miscophus aenescens (Bridwell, 1920) i c g
 Miscophus aeneus Lomholdt, 1985 i c g
 Miscophus aenigma Honoré, 1944 i c g
 Miscophus affinis Pulawski, 1964 i c g
 Miscophus agadiriensis de Andrade, 1954 i c g
 Miscophus akrofisianus Balthasar, 1954 i c g
 Miscophus albomaculatus de Andrade, 1960 i c g
 Miscophus albufeirae de Andrade, 1952 i c g
 Miscophus alfierii Honoré, 1944 i c g
 Miscophus americanus W. Fox, 1890 i c g b
 Miscophus andradei P. Verhoeff, 1955 i c g
 Miscophus angolensis Lomholdt, 1985 i c g
 Miscophus antares de Andrade, 1956 i c g
 Miscophus arenarum Cockerell, 1898 i c g
 Miscophus ater Lepeletier de Saint Fargeau, 1845 i c g
 Miscophus atlanteus de Andrade, 1956 i c g
 Miscophus atrescens Lomholdt, 1985 i c g
 Miscophus aurulentus Lomholdt, 1985 i c g
 Miscophus bellulus Arnold, 1924 i c g
 Miscophus belveriensis de Andrade, 1960 i c g
 Miscophus benidormicus P. Verhoeff, 1955 i c g
 Miscophus berlandi de Andrade, 1956 i c g
 Miscophus betpakdalensis Kazenas, 1992 i c g
 Miscophus bicolor Jurine, 1807 i c g
 Miscophus bonifaciensis Ferton, 1896 i c g
 Miscophus botswanaensis Lomholdt, 1985 i c g
 Miscophus bridwelli Lomholdt, 1985 i c g
 Miscophus bytinskii P. Verhoeff, 1955 i c g
 Miscophus californicus (Ashmead, 1898) i c g
 Miscophus canariensis de Beaumont, 1968 i c g
 Miscophus caninus de Andrade, 1953 i c g
 Miscophus carolinae Schmid-Egger, 2002 i c g
 Miscophus ceballosi de Andrade, 1954 i c g
 Miscophus chrysis Kohl, 1894 i c g
 Miscophus clypearis Honoré, 1944 i c g
 Miscophus coerulescens Arnold, 1923 i
 Miscophus collaris Honoré, 1944 i c g
 Miscophus concolor Dahlbom, 1844 i c g
 Miscophus corsicus de Andrade, 1960 i c g
 Miscophus crassipes Lomholdt, 1985 i c g
 Miscophus ctenopus Kohl, 1884 i c g
 Miscophus cyanescens R. Turner, 1917 i c g
 Miscophus cyanurus (Rohwer, 1909) i c g
 Miscophus deserti Berland, 1943 c g
 Miscophus deserticolus R. Turner, 1929 i c g
 Miscophus desertorum Kazenas, 1978 i c g
 Miscophus difficilis Nurse, 1903 i c g
 Miscophus dispersus de Andrade, 1954 i c g
 Miscophus eatoni E. Saunders, 1903 i c g
 Miscophus eburneus Simon Thomas, 1995 i c g
 Miscophus elegans de Andrade, 1960 i c g
 Miscophus evansi (Krombein, 1963) i c g
 Miscophus eximius Gussakovskij, 1934 i c g
 Miscophus exoticus Taschenberg, 1870 i c g
 Miscophus fasciatus Lomholdt, 1985 i c g
 Miscophus flavopictus Pulawski, 1964 i c g
 Miscophus fluviatilis Lomholdt, 1985 i c g
 Miscophus funebris Honoré, 1944 i c g
 Miscophus galei (Rohwer, 1909) i c g
 Miscophus garianensis de Andrade, 1956 i c g
 Miscophus gegensumus Tsuneki, 1971 i c g
 Miscophus gibbicollis Giner Marí, 1945 i c g
 Miscophus gineri P. Verhoeff, 1955 i c g
 Miscophus gobiensis Tsuneki, 1972 i c g
 Miscophus grangeri de Beaumont, 1968 i c g
 Miscophus gratiosus de Andrade, 1960 i c g
 Miscophus gratuitus de Andrade, 1954 i c g
 Miscophus guichardi de Beaumont, 1968 i c g
 Miscophus gussakovskiji de Andrade, 1954 i c g
 Miscophus handlirschi Kohl, 1892 i c g
 Miscophus hebraeus de Andrade, 1954 i c g
 Miscophus heliophilus Pulawski, 1968 i c g
 Miscophus helveticus Kohl, 1883 i c g
 Miscophus hissaricus Gussakovskij, 1935 i c g
 Miscophus histrionicus Balthasar, 1954 i c g
 Miscophus ichneumonoides Arnold, 1929 i c g
 Miscophus iliensis Kazenas, 1992 i c g
 Miscophus imitans Giner Marí, 1945 i c g
 Miscophus impressifrons Lomholdt, 1985 i c g
 Miscophus impudens de Andrade, 1960 i c g
 Miscophus inconspicuus de Andrade, 1960 i c g
 Miscophus infernalis Arnold, 1929 i c g
 Miscophus insolitus de Andrade, 1953 i c g
 Miscophus insulicola Balthasar, 1954 i c g
 Miscophus italicus A. Costa, 1867 i c g
 Miscophus johni Mokrousov, 2004 i c g
 Miscophus kansensis (Slansky, 1969) i c g
 Miscophus karrooensis Arnold, 1923 i c g
 Miscophus kohlii Brauns, 1899 i c g
 Miscophus kriechbaumeri Brauns, 1899 i c g
 Miscophus krunki Lomholdt, 1985 i c g
 Miscophus laticeps (Ashmead, 1898) i c g
 Miscophus levantinus Balthasar, 1954 i c g
 Miscophus lissonotus Lomholdt, 1985 i c g
 Miscophus littoreus de Andrade, 1960 i c g
 Miscophus luctuosus de Andrade, 1960 i c g
 Miscophus lugubris Arnold, 1929 i c g
 Miscophus lusitanicus de Andrade, 1952 i c g
 Miscophus maculipes Arnold, 1945 i c g
 Miscophus magnus Kazenas, 1992 i c g
 Miscophus maurus (Rohwer, 1909) i c g
 Miscophus mavromoustakisi de Andrade, 1953 i c g
 Miscophus merceti de Andrade, 1952 i c g
 Miscophus mimeticus Honoré, 1944 i c g
 Miscophus minutus de Andrade, 1953 i c g
 Miscophus mochii Arnold, 1940 i c g
 Miscophus modestus Arnold, 1929 i c g
 Miscophus mongolicus Tsuneki, 1972 i c g
 Miscophus montanus Gussakovskij, 1935 i c g
 Miscophus nevesi de Andrade, 1952 i c g
 Miscophus nicolai Ferton, 1896 i c g
 Miscophus niger Dahlbom, 1844 i c g
 Miscophus nigrescens (Rohwer, 1909) i c g
 Miscophus nigricans Cameron, 1907 i c g
 Miscophus nigriceps (Rohwer, 1911) i c g
 Miscophus nigripes Honoré, 1944 i c g
 Miscophus nigriventris Kazenas, 1992 i c g
 Miscophus niloticus Honoré, 1944 i c g
 Miscophus nitidior de Beaumont, 1968 i c g
 Miscophus nobilis de Andrade, 1960 i c g
 Miscophus numidus de Beaumont, 1968 i c g
 Miscophus obscuritarsis Pulawski, 1964 i c g
 Miscophus occidentalis de Andrade, 1960 i c g
 Miscophus oraniensis Brauns, 1906 i c g
 Miscophus othello Balthasar, 1954 i c g
 Miscophus paolorosai Schmid-Egger, 2011 i c g
 Miscophus papyrus de Andrade, 1954 i c g
 Miscophus pardoi de Andrade, 1954 i c g
 Miscophus percitus Mokrousov, 2004 i c g
 Miscophus pharaonis Arnold, 1940 i c g
 Miscophus portoi de Andrade, 1956 i c g
 Miscophus postumus Bischoff, 1921 i c g
 Miscophus pretiosus Kohl, 1884 i c g
 Miscophus primogeniti de Andrade, 1954 i c g
 Miscophus pseudochrysis (Simon Thomas, 1995) i c g
 Miscophus pseudomimeticus de Andrade, 1960 i c g
 Miscophus pseudonotogonia Brauns, 1899 i c g
 Miscophus pulcher de Andrade, 1953 i c g
 Miscophus pulcherrimus Lomholdt, 1985 i c g
 Miscophus punctatissimus Lomholdt, 1985 i c g
 Miscophus punicus de Andrade, 1954 i c g
 Miscophus quettaensis Nurse, 1903 i c g
 Miscophus rasilis Kazenas, 1993 i c g
 Miscophus repetekus Kazenas, 1993 i c g
 Miscophus reticulatus Schmid-Egger, 2014 i g
 Miscophus rothneyi Bingham, 1897 i c g
 Miscophus rufigaster Simon Thomas, 1995 i c g
 Miscophus rufiventris Tsuneki, 1972 i c g
 Miscophus sabulosus Lomholdt, 1985 i c g
 Miscophus sallitus de Andrade, 1960 i c g
 Miscophus scintillans de Andrade, 1956 i c g
 Miscophus sericeus Radoszkowski, 1876 i c g
 Miscophus seyrigi Arnold, 1945 i c g
 Miscophus similis F. Morawitz, 1897 i c g
 Miscophus sirius de Andrade, 1956 i c g
 Miscophus slossonae (Ashmead in Kohl, 1897) i c g
 Miscophus soikai de Beaumont, 1952 i c g
 Miscophus sordidatus Arnold, 1945 i c g
 Miscophus specularis de Andrade, 1960 i c g
 Miscophus spinifer Lomholdt, 1985 i c g
 Miscophus spurius (Dahlbom, 1832) i c g
 Miscophus stevensoni Arnold, 1923 i c g
 Miscophus susterai Balthasar, 1954 i c g
 Miscophus syriacus de Andrade, 1960 i c g
 Miscophus tagiurae de Andrade, 1954 i c g
 Miscophus temperatus Balthasar, 1954 i c g
 Miscophus texanus (Ashmead, 1898) i c g
 Miscophus timberlakei (Bridwell, 1920) i c g
 Miscophus tinctus de Andrade, 1956 i c g
 Miscophus transcaspicus de Andrade, 1960 i c g
 Miscophus tricolor Kazenas, 1992 i c g
 Miscophus tshardarensis Kazenas, 1992 i c g
 Miscophus turanicus Kazenas, 1992 i c g
 Miscophus turkmenicus Kazenas, 1993 i c g
 Miscophus turneri Lomholdt, 1985 i c g
 Miscophus unigena Balthasar, 1954 i c g
 Miscophus venustus de Beaumont, 1969 i c g
 Miscophus verecundus Arnold, 1924 i c g
 Miscophus verhoeffi de Andrade, 1952 i c g
 Miscophus wieringi Simon Thomas, 1995 i c g
 Miscophus yermasoyensis Balthasar, 1954 i c g
 Miscophus zakakiensis Balthasar, 1954 i c g
 Miscophus zergericus Kazenas, 1993 i c g

Data sources: i = ITIS, c = Catalogue of Life, g = GBIF, b = Bugguide.net

References

Miscophus
Articles created by Qbugbot